Ratón Pass is a 7,834 ft (2,388 m) elevation mountain pass on the Colorado–New Mexico border in the western United States.  It is located on the eastern side of the Sangre de Cristo Mountains between Trinidad, Colorado and Raton, New Mexico, approximately 180 miles (290 km) northeast of Santa Fe. Ratón is Spanish for "mouse".  The pass crosses the line of volcanic mesas that extends east from the Sangre de Cristo Mountains along the state line, and furnishes the most direct land route between the valley of the Arkansas River to the north and the upper valley of the Canadian River, leading toward Santa Fe, to the south.  The pass now carries Interstate 25 and railroad tracks.

The pass is a historically significant landmark on the Santa Fe Trail, a major 19th-century settlement route between Kansas City, Missouri and Santa Fe.  It was designated a National Historic Landmark in 1960 for this association.

History
In 1821, Captain William Becknell laid the path of the Santa Fe Trail through the pass. In 1846, during the Mexican–American War, Stephen W. Kearny and his troops passed through the pass en route to New Mexico. During the Civil War, it was the primary path into New Mexico since it avoided Confederate raiders.  It was later developed into a toll road by Richens Lacey Wootton.

Railroad route

In the late 19th century, Raton Pass was the Atchison, Topeka and Santa Fe Railway's (AT&SF) primary route through the mountains. Along with Royal Gorge in Colorado, the pass was one of the focal points for the 1878–79 Railroad Wars between the AT&SF and the smaller Denver and Rio Grande Railroad. The tunnel is in New Mexico, but just barely so, with its northern portal lying only a few feet south of the Colorado border.

The route is now owned by BNSF, which absorbed the AT&SF in 1996. While it is still used by Amtrak's Chicago–Los Angeles Southwest Chief, freight traffic shifted from Raton Pass to the Belen Cutoff (1908), whose gradients do not exceed 1.25%. As a result, with Raton Pass having little to no freight traffic, BNSF said in 2012 that they could not justify maintenance of the route to Amtrak's standards between La Junta, Colorado, and Lamy, New Mexico, placing the future of rail transportation over the pass in jeopardy.

Highway route
In the 20th century, the pass was used as the route of U.S. Route 85 and, later, Interstate 25 between Denver and Albuquerque.

In popular culture
The pass was part of a Townes Van Zandt song "Snowin' on Raton". During a live performance, Townes commented how he liked playing a show in Colorado because he didn't have to explain what Raton was.

The 1951 western movie Raton Pass stars Academy Award actress Patricia Neal.

Raton Pass is mentioned in C. W. McCall's (Bill Fries) song "Four Wheel Cowboy", from his album Wilderness. "Four Wheel Cowboy" also appears on his compilation release, titled "The Best of C. W. McCall".

Clint Black makes reference to the Raton Pass in the song "The Goodnight-Loving" from the album "Put Yourself in My Shoes."
Ridin' against the wind in east New Mexico,
His skin is dry and worn as the Texas plains.
He's headed where the air is thin and the cold blue northers blow,
Up through the Raton Pass, but he'll have to beat the early snow,

In the 1951 Randolph Scott film Santa Fe there is a part about how the Santa Fe railroad acquired Raton Pass for the use of the rail road.

Gallery

See also

National Register of Historic Places listings in Las Animas County, Colorado
National Register of Historic Places listings in Colfax County, New Mexico
List of National Historic Landmarks in Colorado
List of National Historic Landmarks in New Mexico

References

Further reading

External links 

Raton Tunnel
 “Glorieta and Raton Passes: Gateways to the Southwest”, a National Park Service Teaching with Historic Places (TwHP) lesson plan
Raton Line: The Original Santa Fe Transcontinental, a railroad history of Raton Pass

Atchison, Topeka and Santa Fe Railway
Landforms of Las Animas County, Colorado
Interstate 25
Landforms of Colfax County, New Mexico
Mountain passes of Colorado
Mountain passes of New Mexico
National Historic Landmarks in Colorado
National Historic Landmarks in New Mexico
Natural features on the National Register of Historic Places in New Mexico
Rail mountain passes of the United States
Santa Fe Trail
Transportation in Colfax County, New Mexico
Transportation in Las Animas County, Colorado
Raton, New Mexico
National Register of Historic Places in Colfax County, New Mexico
National Register of Historic Places in Las Animas County, Colorado